The Gaudeamus Foundation and Contemporary Music Center organizes and promotes contemporary musical activities and concerts in the Netherlands and abroad. It focuses on supporting the career development of young composers and musicians, particularly Dutch, through its library facilities, contacts with international organizations, and its own activities. Gaudeamus was founded at Bilthoven, the Netherlands, in 1945 by Walter A. F. Maas, a Jewish immigrant from Mainz. It was originally headquartered in the Huize Gaudeamus, a villa built in the shape of a grand piano by the composer Julius Röntgen, also an immigrant from Germany but two generations older. Although in 2008 the Gaudeamus Foundation was incorporated into the Muziek Centrum Nederland, as from 2011 it continues to operate independently.

Activities
Gaudeamus International Composers Award, focuses on music by young composers and includes composers' competition.
International Gaudeamus Interpreters Competition, for performers of contemporary music.
Concerts and festivals
Library and documentation center for contemporary music
Gaudeamus Information, newsletter
Co-producer of the Output Festival, edition 2007

See also
 Donemus

References
Anon. 2001. "Gaudeamus Foundation". The New Grove Dictionary of Music and Musicians, second edition, edited by Stanley Sadie and John Tyrrell. London: Macmillan Publishers.

Further reading
 Peters, Peter. 1996. Eeuwige jeugd. Een halve eeuw Stichting Gaudeamus. Amsterdam: Donemus.

External links 
Muziek Centrum Nederland
European Conference of Promoters of New Music (ECPNM)

 
Music organisations based in the Netherlands
1945 establishments in the Netherlands
Contemporary classical music festivals
Organizations established in 1945